The Spanish monarchs of the House of Habsburg and Philip V used separate versions of their royal arms as sovereigns of the Kingdom of Naples-Sicily, Sardinia and the Duchy of Milan with the arms of these territories.

Introduction
The Kingdom of Sicily was ruled as an independent kingdom by relatives or cadet branch of the house of Aragon until 1409 and thence as part of the Crown of Aragon. The Kingdom of Naples was ruled by the Angevin ruler René of Anjou until the two thrones were reunited by Alfonso V of Aragon, after the successful siege of Naples and the defeat of René on 6 June 1443. Eventually, Alfonso of Aragon divided the two kingdoms during his rule. He gave the rule of Naples to his illegitimate son Ferdinand I of Naples, who ruled from 1458 to 1494, and Aragon and Sicily
to Alfonso's brother John II of Aragon. Eventually the Kingdom of Naples was reunited with the Aragonese Kingdom.The titles were held by the Aragonese kings of the Aragonese
Crown until 1516, followed by the Kings of Spain until the end of the Spanish branch of the House of Habsburg in 1700.

When Francesco II Sforza, duke of Milan died without heirs in 1535, emperor Charles V got the Duchy. The Emperor held the Duchy throughout, eventually investing it on his son prince Philip.  The possession of the Duchy by Spain was finally recognized by the French in the Treaty of Cateau-Cambrésis in 1559.

 The Royal Arms of Sicily after 1282 were blazoned Per saltire Aragon and Hohenstaufen: 1/4 are the arms of Aragon (Or, four pales Gules), and 2/3 are the arms of the House of Hohenstaufen (Argent, an eagle Sable).
 The Royal Arms of Naples used by the monarchs of the House of Trastámara were borne by Charles III of Naples as his heirs: the arms of Hungary (Barry of eight Gules and Argent), the arms of the Kingdom of Jerusalem (Argent, the Jerusalem Cross Or) and the ancient arms of Anjou (Azure semé-de-lys Or charged with a label of three points Gules). In 1504 Ferdinand II of Aragon became monarch of Naples and added the arms of Charles III in his heraldry but he removed the arms of Anjou.
 The Ducal Arms of Milan (used at the time of the House of Sforza) were the biscione, a heraldic charge showing on Argent an Azure serpent in the act of consuming  a human quartering, with the Imperial eagle (the earlier single-headed).

The Kingdom of Naples-Sicily and the Duchy of Milan remained in Spanish hands until the War of the Spanish Succession in the early 18th century, when Milan was conquered by the Austrians and Naples-Sicily passed to the House of Savoy.

Gallery

See also
Historical Spanish coats of arms
Duchy of Milan
Kingdom of Naples
Kingdom of Sicily
Monarchs of Spain
Italian heraldry
Spanish heraldry

Notes

References 

 Francisco Olmos, José María de. «Las primeras acuñaciones del príncipe Felipe de España (1554–1556): Soberano de Milán Nápoles e Inglaterra». «The First Coins of Prince Felipe of Spain (1554–1556): Sovereign of Milan, Naples and England», pp. 165–166. Documenta & Instrumenta, 3 (2005). Madrid, Universidad Complutense. PP. 155–186.
Menéndez-Pidal De Navascués, Faustino; «El escudo»; Menéndez Pidal y Navascués, Faustino; O´Donnell, Hugo; Lolo, Begoña (1999). Símbolos de España. Madrid: Centro de Estudios Políticos y Constitucionales. .

Spanish Monarchs
Spanish Monarchs
Italy–Spain relations
Spanish monarchs in Italy